Hridayanath (English translation:Ruler of the Heart) is a 2012 Indian Marathi film directed by Amar Gupte, produced by Nitesh Waghmare and shot by Kedar Gaikwad. The film stars Jackie Shroff, Aditya Pancholi and Swarangi Marathe The film's music is composed by Santosh Mulekar, and the playback singers include Sunidhi Chauhan, Hamsika Iyer, Shankar Mahadevan and Adnan Sami.

Plot 
Sawant is a respected teacher known as Tatya to everyone in his society his good deeds are such that even after retirement people come to take his advice.He is a loving husband and a supportive father his daughter Akshata is completing her education in the village as she couldn't make it to the city everything thing is going well until. Tatya suffers a massive heart attack which he can't sustain and heart transplant is the only way for survival.Tatya is transplanted with the heart of gangster Nawab Parkar and after the transplant Tatya is not the same he starts to live like Nawab Parkar and also speak his language and extort money from people.

Cast 
 Jackie Shroff
 Aditya Pancholi
 Swarangi Marathe
 Prashant Neman
 Kamlesh Sawant
 Arun Kadam
 Chinmayi Sumit
 Ameya Hunaswadkar
 Urmila Matondkar as item number "Yana Yana"

Soundtrack
The music was composed by Santosh Mulekar and released by Shemaroo Entertainment.

References

External links
 

2012 films
Indian drama films
2010s Marathi-language films